Heiligerlee (abbreviation: Hle) was a railway stop in the village of Heiligerlee in the Netherlands. It was located on the Harlingen–Nieuweschans railway between the railway stations of Scheemda and Winschoten in the province of Groningen. Trains operated by Staatsspoorwegen called at Heiligerlee from 1908 until the railway stop was closed in 1934.

Location 
It is situated on the Harlingen–Nieuweschans railway between the railway stations of Scheemda in the east and Winschoten in the west.

History 
The segment of the Harlingen–Nieuweschans railway between the railway stations of Groningen and Winschoten was opened in 1868. The train services at Heiligerlee started on 1 January 1908 and were provided by Maatschappij tot Exploitatie van Staatsspoorwegen. The stop was closed on 15 May 1934.

Layout 

The double track railway passed through Heiligerlee from northwest to southeast. The public road crossed the railway just before the railway stop. At the stop, there were two platforms, one north and one south of the tracks.

References 

1908 establishments in the Netherlands
1930s disestablishments in the Netherlands
Defunct railway stations in Groningen (province)
Railway stations closed in 1934
Railway stations on the Staatslijn B
Railway stations opened in 1908
Transport in Oldambt (municipality)
Railway stations in the Netherlands opened in the 20th century